Expositio en Brevis in Lucam ("A Brief Commentary on Luke") is a work by the ninth-century Benedictine monk Christian of Stavelot. As its name implies, it is a commentary on the Gospel of Luke. It is, however, not nearly as comprehensive as his earlier Expositio in Matthaeum Evangelistam.

9th-century Christian texts